Xyrichtys mundiceps, the Cape razorfish, is a species of marine ray-finned fish from the family Labridae, the wrasses. Found in the Eastern Central Pacific.  

Etymology
The fish is named by Gill.

References

mundiceps
Taxa named by Theodore Gill
Fish described in 1862
Fish of the Pacific Ocean